Ilya Vorotnikov (born 1 February 1986) is a Kazakh footballer who plays as a centre back for FC Caspiy and Kazakhstan.

Career statistics

Club

International

Honours
Alma-Ata
Kazakhstan Cup (1): 2006
Atyrau	
Kazakhstan Cup (1): 2009

References

External links

1986 births
Living people
Kazakhstani footballers
Kazakhstan international footballers
Kazakhstan Premier League players
FC Irtysh Pavlodar players
FC Atyrau players
FC Kairat players
FC Akzhayik players
FC Taraz players
FC Caspiy players
Association football defenders